Borzavár is a village in Veszprém county in Hungary in Zirc District near the town of Zirc (5 km west) in the High Bakony Mountains. From the village and the surrounding countryside the twin caps of the Koris-hill (709 m or 2326 ft) and the Kék-hill (661 m or 2168 ft) create a beautiful panoramic view.

Distances: by 30 minutes from the beautiful city of Veszprém, 40 minutes from lake Lake Balaton, 45 minutes from Győr, the city of three streams, 1,5 hours from Budapest and Bratislava and 2 hours from Vienna.

History
The village has got 743 inhabitants (2008 census), nearly all of them are Hungarian. Neighbouring settlements are Csesznek and Porva villages, and Zirc town.
The territory of the settlement is inhabited from the stone age. The village has been found by Daniel Esterházy in 1761. The village was settled by Slovaks, Hungarians and Germans. In 1910 Borzavár was a village in the Zirc district of Veszprém County. Number of its inhabitants in 1910: 1120; 1118 (99,8%) Hungarian and 2 (0,2%) other by mother tongue, 1097 (97,9%) Roman Catholic, 12 (1,1%) Calvinist, 6 (0,5%) Jew and 5 (0,5%) Lutheran by religion.

External links
 Street map (Hungarian)
 Borzavar.hu (Hungarian)

Populated places in Zirc District